Rick Shiels (born 3 July 1986) is a British YouTuber and golf professional, best known for his YouTube channel, Rick Shiels Golf. In June 2019, his channel became the biggest golf channel on YouTube after surpassing 561,500 subscribers. As of March, 2023, he now has over 2.48 million subscribers.

Biography 
Shiels was born in Bolton, England on 3 July 1986. He began playing golf at Hart Common Golf Club in Westhoughton at the age of 11. He earned a diploma in golf studies at Myerscough College. Ten years after he began playing golf, he started working at Mere Golf and Country Club in Cheshire, England after completing his PGA training and becoming a qualified pro. He then worked at Trafford Golf Centre where, in 2011, he started his YouTube channel, posting various videos related to golf as an attempt to gain more customers. Slowly, he began gaining traction, and in June 2020, he became the first golf blogger to amass 1 million subscribers. In 2019, Shiels helped host the first ever YouTube Golf Day which raised over £15,000 for Prostate Cancer UK. The event gathered 44 creators with over 19 million combined followers. He has also partnered with many large brands like Nike, Inc., Garmin, and Mastercard to create multiple mini-series on his YouTube channel.

Over the years, his videos have featured multiple celebrities like Robbie Williams and Eddie Hall. By April 2021, he had over 1.54 million subscribers on his YouTube channel, with over 374 million views. His channel's content covers many aspects of golf, including golf equipment reviews, instructional tips, golf stories, and more. Shiels also hosts a podcast called The Rick Shiels Golf Show, which is available on multiple podcast platforms and a second YouTube channel, of the same name, on which he posts clips and full episodes of the podcast. In February 2021, Shiels announced, on his podcast, that he had ended his long-time partnership with Nike officially at tShiels, but when the contract was finished, Nike hoped to get Shiels to switch to a 'paid to post' model with Shiels encouraging viewers to buy Nike apparel; not wanting to do this, Shiels decided not to renew the partnership.

As of July 2022, Rick has a new apparel partnership with the clothing brand Lyle & Scott

References 

1986 births
Living people
British male golfers
British YouTubers
British golf instructors